Koldino is a rural locality (a village) in Kovarditskoye Rural Settlement, Muromsky District, Vladimir Oblast, Russia. The population was 73 as of 2010. There are 3 streets.

Geography 
Koldino is located on the Ilevna River, 9 km west of Murom (the district's administrative centre) by road. Lazarevo is the nearest rural locality.

References 

Rural localities in Muromsky District
Muromsky Uyezd